Jund Filasṭīn ("the military district of Palestine") was one of the military districts of the Umayyad and Abbasid province of Bilad al-Sham (Levant), organized soon after the Muslim conquest of the Levant in the 630s. Jund Filastin, which encompassed most of Palaestina Prima and Palaestina Tertia, included the newly established city of Ramla as its capital and eleven administrative districts (kura), each ruled from a central town.

History

Muslim conquest
The Muslim conquest of Palestine is difficult to reconstruct, according to the historian Dominique Sourdel. It is generally agreed that the Qurayshite commander Amr ibn al-As was sent to conquer the area by Caliph Abu Bakr, likely in 633. Amr traversed the Red Sea coast of the Hejaz (western Arabia), reached the port town of Ayla at the head of the Gulf of Aqaba, then crossed into the Negev Desert or further west into the Sinai Peninsula. He then arrived to the villages of Dathin and Badan near Gaza, where he entered negotiations with the Byzantine garrison commander. The talks collapsed and the Muslims bested the Byzantines in the subsequent clash at Dathin in February or March 634. At this stage of the conquest Amr's troops encamped at Ghamr al-Arabat in the middle of the Araba Valley between the Dead Sea and the Gulf of Aqaba. The town of Gaza was left alone, with Amr's primary objective at the time being the subjugation of the Arab tribes in the vicinity.

After the Muslims armies led by Khalid ibn al-Walid captured Bosra in the Hauran in May 634 they crossed the Jordan River to reinforce Amr as he faced a large Byzantine army. In the aftermath of Ajnadayn, Amr captured the towns of Sebastia, Nablus, Lydda, Yibna, Amwas, Bayt Jibrin and Jaffa. Most of these towns fell after minor resistance, hence the scant information available about them in the sources.

Following the decisive Muslim victory against the Byzantines at the Battle of Yarmouk (636), fought along the Yarmouk tributary of the Jordan River east of Palestine, Amr besieged Jerusalem, which held out until the arrival of Caliph Umar, to whom Jerusalem's leaders surrendered in 637. The coastal towns of Gaza, Ascalon and Caesarea had continued to hold out. The commander Alqama ibn Mujazziz may have been sent against Byzantine forces in Gaza a number of times during and after Ajnadayn. Amr launched his conquest of Egypt from Jerusalem . Caesarea was besieged for a lengthy period and captured most likely by Mu'awiya ibn Abi Sufyan in 639, 640 or 641. Not long after, Mu'awiya captured Ascalon, completing the conquest of Palestine, most of which had been undertaken by Amr.

Early administration
Filastin became one of the four original junds (military districts) of Bilad al-Sham (Islamic Syria) established by Caliph Umar. In effect the Muslims maintained the preexisting administrative organization of the Byzantine district of Palaestina Prima.

The Umayyad period (661–750) was a relatively prosperous period for Filastin and the Umayyad caliphs invested considerably in the district's development. According to Sourdel, "Palestine was particularly honoured in the Umayyad period". The first Umayyad caliph, Mu'awiya ibn Abi Sufyan, who held overall authority over Syria, including Palestine, from the reign of Caliph Uthman, was initially recognized as caliph in a ceremony in Jerusalem.

On the other hand, a change in Syria's policy during the Abbasid period resulted in a decline in the region. Syria was now further from the seat of authority as the capital relocated from Damascus to Baghdad. The new policy preferred Iraq over Syria for several reasons: the local Arab population was strongly identified with their rivals, the Umayyads. Moreover, the Abbasids promoted trade with eastern nations like China and India. This led to neglect, political unrest, and occasionally local revolutions. A process of urban decline is believed to had been accelerated by the 749 earthquake, which increased the number of Jews, Christians, and Samaritans who migrated to diaspora settlements while also leaving behind others who stayed in the devastated towns and impoverished villages until they embraced Islam.

Geography
At its greatest extent, Filastin extended from Rafah in the south to Lajjun in the north, and from the Mediterranean coast well to the east of the southern part of the Jordan River. The mountains of Edom, and the town of Zoar (Sughar) at the southeastern end of the Dead Sea were included in the district. However, the Galilee was excluded, being part of Jund al-Urdunn in the north. Filastin roughly comprised the regions of Samaria, Judea, and the adjacent Mediterranean coastal plain from Mount Carmel in the north to Gaza in the south.

According to al-Baladhuri, the main towns of Filastin, following its conquest by the Rashidun Caliphate, were, from south to north, Rafah, Gaza, Bayt Jibrin, Yibna, Amwas, Lydda, Jaffa, Nablus, Sebastia, and Caesarea. Under Byzantine rule the port city of Caesarea was the territory's capital, a natural choice as it eased communications with the capital Constantinople. After the Muslim conquest, the administrative focus shifted to the interior. Amwas was referred to as a qasaba in the early Islamic sources; the term could refer to a central town, but most likely meant a fortified camp in the case of Amwas. It served as the principal military camp of the Muslim troops, where spoils were divided and stipends paid, until it was abandoned by the troops in 639 due to the plague of Amwas. From about 640 Ludd and/or Jerusalem have been determined as the capital or political-religious center of Filastin, according to modern historians.

After the caliph Sulayman ibn Abd al-Malik founded the city of Ramla next to Ludd, he designated it the capital, and most of Ludd's inhabitants were forced to settle there. In the 9th century, during Abbasid rule, Jund Filastin was the most fertile of Syria's districts, and contained at least twenty mosques, despite its small size.

After the Fatimids conquered the district from the Abbasids, Jerusalem eventually became the capital, and the principal towns were Ascalon, Ramla, Gaza, Arsuf, Caesarea, Jaffa, Jericho, Nablus, Bayt Jibrin, and Amman. The district persisted in some form until the Seljuk invasions and the Crusades of the late 11th century.

Population
At the time of the Arab conquest, Filastin had been inhabited mainly by Aramaic-speaking Miaphysite Christian peasants. Samaria, in the northern part of the district, had a large Samaritan population. The population did not become predominantly Muslim and Arab in identity until several centuries after the conquest. The principal Arab tribes which settled Filastin and formed its army were the Lakhm, Judham, Kinana, Khath'am, Khuza'a, and Azd Sarat.

Samaria was one of the first regions in Palestine to undergo an Islamization process. Samaritan and Christian populations dominated the region during the Byzantine period, but during the early Islamic period, particularly under Abbasid and Tulunid rule, Samaria became gradually Islamized as a result of Arab settlement as well as the impacts of anarchy, high taxes, religious persecution, and droughts, which drove many Samaritans to convert to Islam. By the end of the period, the rural Samaritan population had "disappeared," and the remaining Samaritans had concentrated in urban areas, with Nablus serving as a major center, but there were also communities in Caesarea and Askhelon, and outside of Palestine in cities such as Aleppo, Damascus, and Sarepta.

Governors 
The governors of Jund Filastin:

Rashidun period
Amr ibn al-As and Alqama ibn Mujazziz al-Kinani (634–639; they were assigned as the commanders in charge of Filastin by Caliph Abu Bakr)
Alqama ibn Mujazziz al-Kinani (639–641 or 644; when Amr left Filastin to conquer Egypt, Alqama was left as governor. One version in the Islamic tradition placed his death in 641, while another held that he was governor at the death of Caliph Umar in 644 According to one version Umar made Alqama governor of half of Filastin from his seat in Jerusalem, while Alqama ibn Hakim al-Kinani was appointed over the other half of Palestine from Ramla—Lydda is most likely meant here. This division may have been done following the plague of Amwas in 639.)
Abd al-Rahman ibn Alqama al-Kinani (–645 or 646; governed for undetermined period during the reign of Umar's successor Caliph Uthman in 644–656)
Mu'awiya ibn Abi Sufyan (645 or 646–661; appointed by Caliph Uthman after the death of Abd al-Rahman ibn Alqama; he was already governor of the junds of Dimashq and al-Urdunn under Umar was given authority over Jund Hims by Uthman)

Umayyad period
Al-Harith ibn Abd al-Azdi (673/74–676/77; governed during the reign of Caliph Mu'awiya I)
Hassan ibn Malik ibn Bahdal al-Kalbi (677?–684, governed during the reign of Caliph Mu'awiya I, the latter's son and Hassan's cousin Yazid I, and Yazid's son Mu'awiya II)
Rawh ibn Zinba al-Judhami (680–684, appointed by Hassan ibn Malik as his governor on his behalf)
Abd al-Malik ibn Marwan (685–685; governed for his father Caliph Marwan I, succeeded the latter as caliph later in 685; his caliphal accession was in Jerusalem)
Rawh ibn Zinba al-Judhami (685–685; served as deputy governor for Abd al-Malik)
Yahya ibn al-Hakam (governed for undetermined period in 685–694 for his nephew Caliph Abd al-Malik; inscription on a milestone dated to 692 was found at Samakh crediting him for a roadwork at Fiq, both places in neighboring Jund al-Urdunn; his tombstone was found near Katzrin, in Jund al-Urdunn)
Aban ibn Marwan (governed for undetermined period during the rule of his brother Caliph Abd al-Malik)
Sulayman ibn Abd al-Malik (pre-705–715; governed for part of his father Caliph Abd al-Malik's reign and the full reign of his brother al-Walid I: continued to rule from Palestine, either from Ramla or Jerusalem, until later moving to Jund Qinnasrin)
Nadr ibn Yarim ibn Ma'dikarib ibn Abraha ibn al-Sabbah (717–720; governed during the reign of Caliph Umar II; a chief of the Himyar nobility of Jund Hims)
Sa'id ibn Abd al-Malik (February 743–April 744; governed during the reign of his nephew Caliph al-Walid II)
Yazid ibn Sulayman ibn Abd al-Malik (744–744; rebel governor installed by the troops of Palestine led by Rawh ibn Zinba's son Sa'id, who expelled Yazid's uncle Sa'id ibn Abd al-Malik)
Dab'an ibn Rawh ibn Zinba al-Judhami (744–745; appointed by Caliph Yazid III after the surrender of the rebel troops of Palestine)
Thabit ibn Nu'aym al-Judhami (745–745; was chosen by the troops of Palestine as their governor and swore allegiance to Caliph Marwan II before rebelling against him shortly after)
Al-Rumahis ibn Abd al-Aziz al-Kinani (745–750; appointed governor by Marwan II during Thabit's revolt and continued in office until the Abbasid Revolution)

Abbasid period
 Salih ibn Ali (751–753; governed during the reign of his nephew Caliph al-Saffah)
 Abd al-Wahhab ibn Ibrahim (–775)
 Nasr ibn Muhammad ibn al-Ash'ath al-Khuza'i (777–777; governed during the reign of Caliph al-Mahdi but reassigned to Sind in the same year)
 Ibrahim ibn Salih (–780)
 Al-Fadl ibn Rawh ibn Hatim al-Muhallabi (–787) 
 Ibrahim ibn Salih (787–)
 Harthama ibn A'yan (–796; a mawla of the Banu Dabba tribe; reassigned to Egypt).
 Sulayman ibn Abi Ja'far (809–811; appointed by his great nephew Caliph al-Amin, his governorship included Damascus and Homs)
 Bugha al-Saghir (863–; appointed by Caliph al-Musta'in)

Fatimid period
Anushtakin al-Dizbari (1023–1026; governed during the reign of Caliph al-Zahir)

See also
 Greater Syria
 Levant
 Mashriq
 Middle East
 Shaam
 Syria Palaestina
 'Ubadah ibn al-Samit

Notes

References

Sources

External links
 Mideastweb Map of "Palestine Under the Caliphs", showing Jund boundaries

Subdivisions of the Abbasid Caliphate
Medieval Israel
Military history of the Umayyad Caliphate
7th-century establishments in Asia
States and territories established in the 7th century
States and territories disestablished in the 11th century
11th-century disestablishments in Asia
Palestine under the Abbasid Caliphate
Palestine under the Umayyad Caliphate